The 21st Asianet Film Awards, honoring the best Malayalam films of 2018, was held on 6 and 7 April 2019 near at FACT Sports Association Ground, Kalamassery, Kochi. The show was hosted by Nyla Usha, Govind Padmasoorya and Prathibha Sai.

Winners and nominations

Other winners

Special awards

External links 
 Official Website on hotstar

References 

A
Asianet Film Awards